Charles Robert Brown (born October 16, 1945) is a former professional American football running back in the National Football League. He attended the University of Missouri. He went on to play with the New Orleans Saints from 1967 to 1968.

Following his career in the NFL, Brown would go on to play two additional seasons in the Canadian Football League with the BC Lions.

References

External links
 Pro-Football reference

1945 births
Living people
American football running backs
American male sprinters
Canadian football running backs
Missouri Tigers football players
Missouri Tigers men's track and field athletes
New Orleans Saints players
BC Lions players
Sportspeople from Jefferson City, Missouri
Players of American football from Missouri